Jocky Sitkanpai; is a Thai Muay Thai fighter who competed in the 1970s.

Biography and career

Phudta Naree started Muay Thai along his elder brother, he fought under the ring name Jocky Sing Sortor in Khon Kaen and neighbouring regions of Thailand until the age of 12. His powerful knees and fearless style beat many opponents in provincial arenas bringing him enough attention to be sent to the capital.

Jocky made his first Bangkok appearance in 1971 for the Sor For Yor Gym under the name Jocky Aor Wattana. He defeated many of the rising contenders of the era until his name was stained by a disqualification in a match against Petchmongkon Lerkchai at Rajadamnern Stadium. His headman, Prasert Kanpai filed a complaint with an x-ray film proving that Jocky was injured and did not intentionally throw the fight. His suspension was then lifted. The Sor For Yor gym name was changed to Sitkanpai Gym around the same time. He became Jocky Sitkanpai ever since.

Between 1974 and 1977 Jocky was one of the most dominant fighter on the Bangkok circuit defeating other champions such as Samersing Tianhiran, Khunponnoi Kiatsuriya, Nongkhai Sor.Prapatsorn, Pudpadnoi Worawut Sagat Petchyindee or Padejsuk Pitsanurachan. During this period he captured the Thailand Bantamweight title in 1974 and the Rajadamnern Stadium Bantamweight title in 1975. At his peak he received purses of over 100,000 baht.

He was the thailand and Muay Thai representant during multiple "Muay Thai vs Karate" events, fighting foreigners fgrom different martial arts backgrounds. In 1977 he beat the american karateka Lindsay Ferguson by knockout in an even with of over 1.1 million baht.

Jocky also took part in the first "two against one" bout in Lumpinee Stadium history. He teamed up with Jitti Muangkhonkaen, they relayed each other to fight Posai Sitiboonlert. They were defeated by decision.

Somat Hong Sakoun the Sor.For.Yor-Sitkanpai gym owner and promotor of Jocky, in honor of his most successful fighter, renamed his camp "Jocky Gym" as Jocky was ending his career. It went on to become the home of numerous champions in the following decades.

After his retirement Jocky went back to live in his native Khon Kaen province where he cultivated sugar cane in a family business.

Titles and accomplishments
 1974 Thailand Bantamweight Champion
 1975 Rajadamnern Stadium Bantamweight Champion

Muay Thai record

|-  style="background:#fbb;"
| 1981-04-24 || Loss||align=left| Weerachat Sorndang ||  || Bangkok, Thailand || KO  || 3 ||

|-  style="background:#fbb;"
| 1980- || Loss||align=left| Samart Prasarnmit ||  || Bangkok, Thailand || KO  || 4 ||

|-  style="background:#fbb;"
| 1980-07-30 || Loss||align=left| Raktae Muangsurin || Rajadamnern Stadium || Bangkok, Thailand || KO || 2 ||

|-  style="background:#cfc;"
| 1980-04-11 || Win ||align=left| Wirachat Sorndaeng || Lumpinee Stadium || Bangkok, Thailand || Decision || 5 || 3:00

|-  style="background:#fbb;"
| 1980-01-22 || Loss||align=left| Youssop Sor.Thanikul || Lumpinee Stadium || Bangkok, Thailand || TKO || 4 ||

|-  style="background:#cfc;"
| 1979-12-07 || Win ||align=left| Banranoi Fairtex || Lumpinee Stadium || Bangkok, Thailand || Decision || 5 || 3:00

|-  style="background:#fbb;"
| 1979-10-22 || Loss ||align=left| Wangwan Lukmatulee || || Chiang Mai, Thailand || Referee Stoppage|| 4 ||

|-  style="background:#fbb;"
| 1979-09-29 || Loss ||align=left| Kraipetch Sor.Prateep || || Ubon Ratchathani province, Thailand || Decision || 5 || 3:00

|-  style="background:#cfc;"
| 1979- || Win ||align=left|  ||  || Tokyo, Japan || ||  ||

|-  style="background:#fbb;"
| 1979- || Loss ||align=left|  ||  || Tokyo, Japan || ||  ||

|-  style="background:#fbb;"
| 1979-07-27 || Loss  ||align=left| Raktae Muangsurin || Lumpinee Stadium || Bangkok, Thailand || KO || 2 || 

|-  style="background:#cfc;"
| 1979- || Win ||align=left| Santisuk Srisotorn || Rajadamnern Stadium || Bangkok, Thailand || Decision || 5 || 3:00

|-  style="background:#fbb;"
| 1979-04-03 || Loss ||align=left| Kaopong Sitchuchai || Lumpinee Stadium || Bangkok, Thailand || Decision || 5 || 3:00

|-  style="background:#fbb;"
| 1978-12-05 || Loss ||align=left| Fakaew Fairtex || Lumpinee Stadium || Bangkok, Thailand || Decision || 5 || 3:00

|-  style="background:#fbb;"
| 1978-07-31 || Loss ||align=left| Seksan Sor.Theppitak ||   || Bangkok, Thailand || Decision || 5 || 3:00

|-  style="background:#fbb;"
| 1978-07-18 || Loss ||align=left| Prawit Sritham || Rajadamnern Stadium || Bangkok, Thailand || Decision || 5 || 3:00

|-  style="background:#fbb;"
| 1978-03-29 || Loss ||align=left| Kengkaj Kiatkriengkrai || Rajadamnern Stadium || Bangkok, Thailand || Referee Stoppage|| 5 ||

|-  style="background:#fbb;"
| 1978-02-24 || Loss ||align=left| Siprae Kiatsompop || Rajadamnern Stadium || Bangkok, Thailand || Decision || 5 || 3:00

|-  style="background:#fbb;"
| 1978-01-18 || Loss ||align=left| Narongnoi Kiatbandit || Rajadamnern Stadium || Bangkok, Thailand || Decision || 5 || 3:00

|-  style="background:#cfc;"
| 1977-12-06 || Win||align=left| Santi Rekchai || Lumpinee Stadium || Bangkok, Thailand || Decision || 5 || 3:00

|-  style="background:#cfc;"
| 1977-10-31 || Win ||align=left| Padejsuk Pitsanurachan ||Lumpinee Stadium|| Bangkok, Thailand || Decision || 5 || 3:00

|-  style="background:#cfc;"
| 1977-09-30 || Win ||align=left| Padejsuk Pitsanurachan ||Lumpinee Stadium|| Bangkok, Thailand || Decision || 5 || 3:00

|-  style="background:#cfc;"
| 1977-09-06 || Win||align=left| Lindsay Ferguson || Lumpinee Stadium || Bangkok, Thailand || KO || 2 ||

|-  style="background:#cfc;"
| 1977-07-06 || Win||align=left| Sagat Porntawee ||  || Bangkok, Thailand || Decision || 5 || 3:00

|-  style="background:#cfc;"
| 1977-05-27 || Win||align=left| Wangwon Lukmatulee || Lumpinee Stadium || Bangkok, Thailand || Decision || 5 || 3:00

|-  style="background:#cfc;"
| 1977-03-31 || Win||align=left| Sagat Porntawee ||  || Bangkok, Thailand || Decision || 5 || 3:00

|-  style="background:#fbb;"
| 1977-02-04 || Loss||align=left| Posai Sitiboonlert || 2 vs 1 Lumpinee Stadium  || Bangkok, Thailand || Decision  || 6 || 3:00
|-
! style=background:white colspan=9 |

|-  style="background:#cfc;"
| 1976-12-18 || Win ||align=left| Ryo Hikari || Jirapawat Boxing Stadium || Nakhon Sawan, Thailand || KO || 2 ||

|-  style="background:#fbb;"
| 1976-10-01 || Loss ||align=left| Ruengsak Porntawee || Lumpinee Stadium || Bangkok, Thailand || Referee Stoppage|| 5 ||

|-  style="background:#fbb;"
| 1976-08-18 || Loss ||align=left| Vicharnnoi Porntawee || Rajadamnern Stadium || Bangkok, Thailand || Decision || 5 || 3:00

|-  style="background:#cfc;"
| 1976-07-02 || Win||align=left| Pudpadnoi Worawut || Lumpinee Stadium || Bangkok, Thailand || Decision || 5 || 3:00

|-  style="background:#fbb;"
| 1976-05-21 || Loss ||align=left| Bundit Singprakarn ||  || Bangkok, Thailand || Decision|| 5 || 3:00

|-  style="background:#c5d2ea;"
| 1976-04-06 || Draw ||align=left| Pudpadnoi Worawut || Lumpinee Stadium || Bangkok, Thailand || Decision || 5 || 3:00

|-  style="background:#cfc;"
| 1976-02-26 || Win||align=left| Bangmod Lukbangkhao || Rajadamnern Stadium || Bangkok, Thailand || KO (Knees)|| 4 ||

|-  style="background:#cfc;"
| 1975-12-29 || Win ||align=left| Denthoraneenoi Ludtaksin || Rajadamnern Stadium || Bangkok, Thailand || Decision || 5 ||3:00

|-  style="background:#fbb;"
| 1975-11-12 || Loss ||align=left| Ruengsak Porntawee || Rajadamnern Stadium || Bangkok, Thailand || Decision|| 5 || 3:00

|-  style="background:#fbb;"
| 1975-09-29 || Loss ||align=left| Narongnoi Kiatbandit || Rajadamnern Stadium || Bangkok, Thailand || Decision || 5 ||3:00

|-  style="background:#cfc;"
| 1975-08-21 || Win ||align=left| Wangwon Lukmatulee || Rajadamnern Stadium || Bangkok, Thailand || Decision || 5 ||3:00

|-  style="background:#cfc;"
| 1975-07-15 || Win ||align=left| Nongkhai Sor.Prapatsorn || Huamark Stadium || Bangkok, Thailand || KO (Knee)|| 3 ||

|-  style="background:#cfc;"
| 1975-06-19 || Win ||align=left| Denthoraneenoi Ludtaksin || Rajadamnern Stadium || Bangkok, Thailand || Decision || 5 ||3:00

|-  style="background:#cfc;"
| 1975-05-14 || Win ||align=left| Khunponnoi Kiatsuriya|| Samrong Stadium || Samut Prakan, Thailand || Decision || 5 ||3:00

|-  style="background:#fbb;"
| 1975-04-24 || Loss ||align=left| Narongnoi Kiatbandit || Rajadamnern Stadium || Bangkok, Thailand || Decision || 5 ||3:00 

|-  style="background:#cfc;"
| 1975-03-19 || Win ||align=left| Samersing Tianhiran || Rajadamnern Stadium || Bangkok, Thailand || Decision || 5 ||3:00

|-  style="background:#cfc;"
| 1975-02-06 || Win ||align=left| Rueanpae Sitwatnang || Rajadamnern Stadium || Bangkok, Thailand || Decision || 5 ||3:00
|-
! style=background:white colspan=9 |

|-  style="background:#cfc;"
| 1975-01- || Win ||align=left| Chansak Singwattana || Rajadamnern Stadium || Bangkok, Thailand || Decision || 5 ||3:00

|-  style="background:#cfc;"
| 1974-12-19 || Win ||align=left| Chansak Singwattana || Rajadamnern Stadium || Bangkok, Thailand || Decision || 5 ||3:00

|-  style="background:#cfc;"
| 1974-11- || Win ||align=left| Charansak Sor.Meechai || Huamark Stadium || Bangkok, Thailand || Decision || 5 ||3:00
|-
! style=background:white colspan=9 |

|-  style="background:#cfc;"
| 1974-10-11 || Win ||align=left| Monprai Ludchaofah || Lumpinee Stadium || Bangkok, Thailand || Decision || 5 ||3:00

|-  style="background:#cfc;"
| 1974- || Win ||align=left| Fakaew Singkhlong || Rajadamnern Stadium || Bangkok, Thailand || KO || 3 ||

|-  style="background:#cfc;"
| 1974- || Win ||align=left| Painum Sor.Singhadet || Rajadamnern Stadium || Bangkok, Thailand || Decision || 5 ||3:00

|-  style="background:#cfc;"
| 1974- || Win ||align=left| Saenrak Tianhiran || Lumpinee Stadium || Bangkok, Thailand || Decision || 5 ||3:00

|-  style="background:#cfc;"
| 1974- || Win ||align=left| Wangwon Lukmatulee || Rajadamnern Stadium || Bangkok, Thailand || Decision || 5 ||3:00

|-  style="background:#cfc;"
| 1974- || Win ||align=left| Kritphet Lukluekhamhan ||  || Ubon Ratchathani, Thailand || Decision || 5 ||3:00

|-  style="background:#cfc;"
| 1974- || Win ||align=left| Fahmeechai Prasopchai || Rajadamnern Stadium || Bangkok, Thailand || Decision || 5 ||3:00

|-  style="background:#cfc;"
| 1974- || Win ||align=left| Norasing Kiatratana || || Phuket, Thailand || Decision || 5 ||3:00

|-  style="background:#fbb;"
| 1974- || Loss ||align=left| Saenrak Tianhiran || Rajadamnern Stadium || Bangkok, Thailand || Decision || 5 ||3:00

|-  style="background:#cfc;"
| 1974- || Win ||align=left| Thapsing Sityodtong || Rajadamnern Stadium || Bangkok, Thailand || Decision || 5 ||3:00

|-  style="background:#cfc;"
| 1974- || Win ||align=left| Daothong Sityodtong ||  || Rayong province, Thailand || KO || 3 ||

|-  style="background:#cfc;"
| 1974- || Win ||align=left| Prakasit Sing ||  || Khon Kaen province, Thailand || KO ||3 ||

|-
| colspan=9 | Legend:

See more
List of Muay Thai practitioners

References

1954 births
Living people
Jocky Sitkanpai
Jocky Sitkanpai